Brunnbach is a small river of Bavaria, Germany. It is a right tributary of the Isar.

Course

The present-day Brunnbach has its source in the bank of the Isar in the former Montgelas Garden in today's Herzogpark area of Bogenhausen. At its beginning, the river crosses several private grounds and partly flows in pipes. A public lawn follows at the Brunnbachleite. On the isle of the Isar in Oberföhring, it supplies a pond by means of a pumping station in the landmarked "Pumpenwärterhäuschen" (house of pumping engineer). The majority of its water reaches the surface at the north of the St. Emmeram bridge from a stone mouth designed as foutain, and then flows into the Isar in two arms.

History

Until the end of the 19th century, the Brunnbach's source was near Bad Brunnthal in the lower Bogenhausen and, like today, reaches the Isar river at St. Emmeram. From the 10th to the 19th century, in Grüntal and St. Emmeram the Brunnbach powered four mills.

At the time the Herzogpark was covered with buildings the Brunnbach was filled up north of the street Montgelaßstraße. The former upper course in the  park is now a river of its own called Brunnthaler Quellbach.

Because of its purity, the water was regarded as curative water. In the 17th century, Brunnthal became a well-known spa, and its operation was continued until 1914. Even today, the springs of Brunnbach have drinking water quality.

In the course of the uncoverage of the Munich rivers, a renaturation of the Brunnbach was also discussed in the 1990s. Not earlier than 10 years later, the section between the Abacostraße and the Opitzstraße was relocated into a new bed within the municipal green area.

The Brunnbach served Thomas Mann as a model for the river in his novella A Man and His Dog.

See also
List of rivers of Bavaria

Rivers of Bavaria
Rivers of Germany